Patrick Casey (born May 23, 1990) is an American middle-distance runner. He ran his first four-minute mile on February 4, 2011. He attended Montana State University before transferring to the University of Oklahoma.

Professional

College career 

One of the NCAA's top milers and 1500m runners, Casey ran a 4:04:44 mile his freshman year, which equates to 3:59.19 after NCAA's altitude-adjustment formula because [Bozeman, Montana] has a 4,800-foot elevation. He ran the first four-minute mile in Montana without altitude-adjustment on February 4, 2011 at 3:59.76.
He transferred from Montana State University to the University of Oklahoma in 2012.

Casey finished second in the 1500 m race at the 2014 USA Track & Field Championships.

In 2015, Casey holds the record for the fastest mile run at Montana State University, with a time of 3:54.59.

High school career 

Casey attended Laurel High School (Montana), coached by head coaches James Haskins and Lisa Condon. In his senior year, he won the individual title in XC, the 800m, 1600m, and 3200m in the state championships. He currently holds the record in the Montana Mile, one of the flagship events of the Montana State Games, running 4:07.09 in 2010.

Personal Bests

References 

1990 births
Living people
American male middle-distance runners
American male steeplechase runners
Track and field athletes from Oklahoma
Montana State Bobcats men's track and field athletes
Oklahoma Sooners men's track and field athletes